Tilly-sur-Seulles War Cemetery is a British Second World War cemetery of Commonwealth soldiers located in the village of Tilly-sur-Seulles, some  south of Bayeux in Normandy. The cemetery contains 990 Commonwealth burials and 232 German graves.

History
The majority of the soldiers interred in the cemetery were killed during the breakout battles (such as Operation Bluecoat) fought by the Allies in July and August 1944. Casualties are from the 7th Armoured Division, 49th (West Riding) Infantry Division and 50th (Northumbrian) Infantry Division as well as a number of Irish Guards officers and servicemen from the Royal Norfolk Regiment. Tilly-sur-Seulles was finally liberated on 18 June 1944 and the first interment in the cemetery was on 8 July 1944. A number of casualties previously in field graves were re-interred in the cemetery.

Notable burials
 Keith Douglas, war poet killed 9 June 1944

Location

See also
 List of military cemeteries in Normandy

References

Further reading
 Shilleto, Carl, and Tolhurst, Mike (2008). A Traveler’s Guide to D-Day and the Battle of Normandy. Northampton, Mass.: Interlink.

External links
 

British military memorials and cemeteries
Canadian military memorials and cemeteries
Commonwealth War Graves Commission cemeteries in France
Operation Overlord cemeteries
World War II memorials in France
1944 establishments in France